Frigyes Nagy (born 6 June 1939) is a Hungarian agrarian engineer and former politician, who served as Minister of Agriculture between 1996 and 1998.

References
 Bölöny, József – Hubai, László: Magyarország kormányai 1848–2004 [Cabinets of Hungary 1848–2004], Akadémiai Kiadó, Budapest, 2004 (5th edition).
 Zsigmond Király Főiskola - Jelenkutató Csoport

1939 births
Living people
People from Mosonmagyaróvár
Hungarian Socialist Party politicians
Agriculture ministers of Hungary
Members of the National Assembly of Hungary (1994–1998)